African Republic can refer to:

 Central African Republic
 South African Republic